The following is a list of characters for the American sitcom Blossom which aired for five seasons on NBC. It debuted as a pilot preview on July 5, 1990, and premiered as a mid-season replacement on January 3, 1991. The series finale episode was broadcast on May 22, 1995. Don Reo created the series, which starred Mayim Bialik as Blossom Russo, a teenager living with her father and two elder brothers. It was produced by Reo's Impact Zone Productions and Witt/Thomas Productions in association with Touchstone Television.

Main characters

Blossom Ruby Russo 
Blossom (Mayim Bialik) is the titular character and youngest child and only daughter of Nick and Maddy Russo. She is also the best friend of Six LeMeure and on-again off-again girlfriend of Vinnie Bonitardi. Blossom learns many hard lessons from the lives of herself, her family and Six, including about abuse, alcohol, drugs, divorce, and many more. Blossom is especially close to her family (including maternal grandfather, Buzz) and develops a strong relationship with her father and two brothers (partially due to the abandonment of her mother). In later seasons, after Nick remarries, Blossom resents but eventually grows to respect her stepmother Carol and new step-sister, Kennedy.

In one episode, Blossom learns from Nick that she was named after jazz singer Blossom Dearie.

Joseph “Joey” Russo 
Joey (Joey Lawrence) is the middle child of the Russo family. He is a not-so-smart baseball player and ladies' man. Joey once questions his paternity after believing that there was a mixup at the hospital at the time of his birth (with Blossom and Tony joking that he lacks the Russo "nose"). He can be sweet and smart when he puts in the effort. Despite his dopiness, Joey gets accepted into Arizona State University, but decides to play professional baseball after graduating from high school. His catch phrase is "Whoa!”

Lawrence's real-life brothers Matthew and Andrew played younger versions of his character in the season 1 episode "Thanks for the Memorex."

Anthony “Tony” Russo 
Tony (Michael Stoyanov) is the eldest child of the Russo family. A recovering drug addict and alcoholic, he has difficulty remembering four years of his life, but still remembers his addictions well enough to warn Joey and Blossom of what happened, marijuana and alcohol having been crutches for the pressures of school life and their parents' separation. He works at a doughnut shop for a period before becoming a paramedic. He is very close to Blossom, who often comes to him for advice. He has a long-term relationship with a Playboy bunny, Rhonda, but later marries Shelly in Las Vegas, after a night of debauchery. Despite the suddenness of their wedding, they decide to give the relationship a try and ultimately decide to stay together. Tony and Shelly welcome a son, Nash Metropolitan Russo, in November 1994. In a crossover with The Fresh Prince of Bel-Air, Hilary Banks goes on a date with Tony after winning a charity auction. 

The character was named after the show's executive producer Tony Thomas.

Nicholas “Nick” Russo 
Nick (Ted Wass) is the father of Blossom, Joey and Tony and is the main caregiver for the Russo family after his wife, Maddy, leaves. He works as a piano player, playing various gigs with a wide range of bands. He and Carol eventually get married, making him the stepfather to Carol's daughter, Kennedy, and he later becomes the grandfather to Tony's child. Nick also treats Blossom's friend, Six, as his own daughter. Because of Tony's alcoholism and drug addiction, he has become overprotective of Joey and Blossom, and has developed a somewhat conservative attitude to parenting. 

In the pilot, the father was named Terry Russo (played by Richard Masur), who worked as an accountant.

Six Dorothy LeMeure 
Six (Jenna von Oÿ) is Blossom's best friend. Her parents are divorced. In the pilot, she alludes to the fact that she was named Six because of the number of beers her father drank in order to get her mother pregnant. A later explanation is that she was the sixth child in her family, although none of her siblings are ever seen. Six goes through many hard times including becoming an alcoholic, dating a married older man, and a pregnancy scare. She thinks of the Russo family as her own and talks rapidly when she is happy, angry, or nervous. She also has a crush on Joey.

Melissa Joan Hart said she was offered the role of Six but chose the lead role on Clarissa Explains It All instead. Don Reo contends he never considered anyone else for Six's role other than Jenna von Oÿ. For season 1 of Blossom, von Oÿ is credited in the pilot's opening sequence, but is listed in the closing credits as a "guest star". Between the shooting of the Blossom pilot and its pick-up as a regular series, von Oÿ had earned a part on the CBS sitcom Lenny (also from Witt/Thomas and Don Reo). With the cancellation of Lenny by March 1991, von Oÿ had reclaimed her originally intended status as a regular Blossom cast member and moved back to the opening credits in season two.

Buzz Richman 
Buzz (Barnard Hughes) is the father of Maddy and the grandfather of Blossom, Joey, and Tony. Buzz is a war veteran and has been married multiple times, but Ruby was his first and Maddy's mother. He loves women, cigars, jokes, and alcohol and moves into the Russo household for a while.

Vincent “Vinnie” Bonitardi 
Vinnie (David Lascher) is Blossom's on-again, off-again boyfriend. Nick does not always like him, but their relationship improves over time. Vinnie gets along with Blossom's family for the most part and though he projects a tough-guy image, can be quite sweet at times.

Rhonda Jo Applegate 
Rhonda (Portia Dawson) is Tony's former on-again, off-again girlfriend. Rhonda is a pin-up model on whom Joey also has a crush.

Carol Russo 
Carol (Finola Hughes) is an Englishwoman with a daughter named Kennedy who eventually marries Nick, becoming the stepmother to his three children. She and Kennedy's father are divorced, but maintain an amicable relationship. In the penultimate episode of the series, Carol realizes that she is pregnant with Nick's child.

Kennedy Russo 
Kennedy (Courtney Chase) is Carol's daughter with Graham, Carol's Scottish ex-husband. She is a young, precocious English girl about age eight. She has puppy love for Joey for a period and after a while, bonds with Tony and Blossom.

Supporting characters

Madeline "Maddy" Richman Russo 
Maddy (Melissa Manchester) is the ex-wife of Nick and mother of Blossom, Joey and Tony who left the family to have her own life. She moves to Paris to pursue a singing career and returns a few years later in an attempt to reconnect, making her first appearance in the series in the season 3 episode "The Thrill is Gone." 

In the pilot, the mother was named Barbara Russo (played by Barrie Youngfellow) and had not left the family.

Sharon LeMeure 
Sharon (Gail Edwards) is the mother of Six who is divorced and dated Nick at one time. Sharon tries to be a good mother, although Six gets in some trouble at times. She is almost identical to her daughter in several ways, including her habit of talking very fast when nervous, upset, or happy. She and her daughter have been known to mirror each other on several occasions.

Shelly Lewis Russo 
Shelly (Samaria Graham) is the wife of Tony and mother of Nash. She is an illustrator who planned to marry her boyfriend Roscoe in Las Vegas when she instead marries Tony in an impulse wedding. Despite their quick union, the couple falls in love and gives their relationship a try. With the aid of Blossom, Shelly gives birth to son Nash in the front seat of a vintage Nash Metropolitan during a freeway traffic jam, while Tony is in an ambulance being held at gun point.

Agnes 
Agnes (Eileen Brennan) is Blossom's neighbor and confidant during the show's first season.

Mrs. Peterson 
Mrs. Peterson (Phyllis Diller) is an elderly paramedic who is paired up with Tony when he joins the profession. She has a habit of smoking, which annoys Tony.

Carl Lewis 
Carl (Ivory Ocean) is Shelly Lewis' father. A police officer, it is humorously revealed he once arrested Nick.

Frank 
Frank (Kevin Jamal Woods) is Kennedy's friend who befriends her in the season 5 episode titled "The Wedding.”

Guest appearances

Cameos 
Throughout the series, there were a number of cameos and guest appearances from musicians, comedians, actors, actresses, and TV personalities.

Other notable guests 
Actors who would become famous later in their careers also appeared as guests:

References 

Blossom
Blossom